Landry Michael Shamet (born March 13, 1997) is an American professional basketball player for the Phoenix Suns of the National Basketball Association (NBA). He played college basketball for the Wichita State Shockers and was selected 26th overall by the Philadelphia 76ers in the 2018 NBA Draft. He has also played for the Los Angeles Clippers and Brooklyn Nets.

Early life
Shamet was born on March 13, 1997, in Kansas City, Missouri, to a single mother Melanie Shamet. His mother went to Boise State University on a volleyball scholarship. His uncle Tyler was a positive influence in his life growing up, and his extended family also provided support in his development. Shamet began playing basketball at the age of two. When he was in middle school, his family went bankrupt after the mortgage increased and they lost their apartment.

Shamet briefly attended Desborough College before attending Park Hill High School in Kansas City, where he was coached by David Garrison He was a student in the Advancement via Individual Determination (AVID) college preparatory program.

College career
Shamet played three games in his freshman season before having to redshirt the season due to a foot injury. In January 2017, he became the point guard for the Shockers. In his redshirt freshman season, Shamet averaged 11.4 points and 3.3 assists per game. He was named to the First team MVC All-Conference and MVC Freshman of the Year. Following the season Shamet had surgery to repair a stress fracture on his foot.

Coming into his sophomore year, Shamet was named to the Preseason First Team All-AAC and was one of fifty players named in the Preseason Wooden Award watch list. He was one of only two sophomores to be selected for the 2018 Wooden Award Midseason Top 25 list. Shamet scored a career-high 30 points to help Wichita State beat Oklahoma State 78-66 on December 9, 2017. Shamet led the AAC in several categories, including assists per game, true shooting percentage, and offensive box plus/minus. He also helped lead the Shockers to the NCAA Tournament each season he played. He averaged 14.9 points and 5.2 assists per game as a sophomore. Following the season he declared for the 2018 NBA draft.

Professional career

Philadelphia 76ers (2018–2019)
Shamet was taken with the 26th pick in the 2018 NBA draft by the Philadelphia 76ers. In the 2018 preseason, Shamet averaged 8.8 points per game, with an 18-point performance in a 120–114 victory over the Dallas Mavericks in China.

Shamet scored a career-high 29 points off the bench on January 8, 2019, in a home victory over the Washington Wizards, including a Sixers rookie record 8 three-pointers.

Los Angeles Clippers (2019–2020)
On February 6, 2019, Shamet was traded to the Los Angeles Clippers. In his first game with them, he scored 17 points, 13 of which were in the 4th quarter, in a comeback from 28 down against the Boston Celtics. On April 15, in Game 2 of the first round against the Golden State Warriors, he scored 12 points and the game winning 3-pointer in a 31-point comeback leading to a 135–131 Clippers victory.

In Game 7 of the second round in the 2020 NBA playoffs, Shamet turned his ankle in the first quarter and had to leave the game, playing only six minutes. The Clippers lost 104–89 to the Denver Nuggets and were eliminated.

Brooklyn Nets (2020–2021)
On November 19, 2020, Shamet was traded to the Brooklyn Nets in a three-team trade that sent Luke Kennard to the Clippers. On January 14, 2021, Shamet switched his number from 13 to 20 since James Harden was traded to the Nets and wanted to wear the number 13.

Phoenix Suns (2021–present)
On August 6, 2021, Shamet was traded to the Phoenix Suns in exchange for Jevon Carter and the draft rights to Day'Ron Sharpe. On October 18, he signed a four-year, $43 million rookie scale extension with the Suns.

Career statistics

NBA

Regular season

|-
| style="text-align:left;"| 
| style="text-align:left;"| Philadelphia
| 54 || 4 || 20.5 || .441 || .404 || .815 || 1.4 || 1.1 || .4 || .1 || 8.3
|-
| style="text-align:left;"| 
| style="text-align:left;"| L.A. Clippers
| 25 || 23 || 27.8 || .414 || .450 || .795 || 2.2 || 2.3 || .5 || .1 || 10.9
|-
| style="text-align:left;"| 
| style="text-align:left;"| L.A. Clippers
| 53 || 30 || 27.4 || .404 || .375 || .855 || 1.9 || 1.9 || .4 || .2 || 9.3
|-
| style="text-align:left;"| 
| style="text-align:left;"| Brooklyn
| 61 || 12 || 23.0 || .408 || .387 || .846 || 1.8 || 1.6 || .5 || .2 || 9.3
|-
| style="text-align:left;"| 
| style="text-align:left;"| Phoenix
| 69 || 14 || 20.8 || .394 || .368 || .840 || 1.8 || 1.6 || .4 || .1 || 8.3
|- class="sortbottom"
| style="text-align:center;" colspan="2"|Career
| 262 || 83 || 23.3 || .410 || .390 || .835 || 1.8 || 1.6 || .4 || .1 || 9.0

Playoffs

|-
| style="text-align:left;"| 2019
| style="text-align:left;"| L.A. Clippers
| 6 || 6 || 29.0 || .342 || .323 || 1.000 || 2.0 || 1.7 || 1.0 || .0 || 7.7
|-
| style="text-align:left;"| 2020
| style="text-align:left;"| L.A. Clippers
| 13 || 4 || 18.7 || .407 || .357 || .714 || 1.7 || 1.3 || .5 || .2 || 5.2
|-
| style="text-align:left;"| 2021
| style="text-align:left;"| Brooklyn
| 12 || 0 || 17.2 || .439 || .385 || .800 || 1.8 || .6 || .4 || .1 || 4.2
|-
| style="text-align:left;"| 2022
| style="text-align:left;"| Phoenix
| 12 || 0 || 16.0 || .396 || .346 || .714 || 1.7 || 1.3 || .5 || .0 || 4.3
|- class="sortbottom"
| style="text-align:center;" colspan="2"|Career
| 43 || 10 || 19.0 || .398 || .352 || .828 || 1.7 || 1.1 || .5 || .1 || 5.0

College

|-
| style="text-align:left;"|2015–16
| style="text-align:left;"|Wichita State
| 3 || 1 || 17.7 || .438 || .300 || .750 || 2.7 || 1.7 || 1.7 || .3 || 8.7
|-
| style="text-align:left;"|2016–17
| style="text-align:left;"|Wichita State
| 36 || 35 || 26.7 || .472 || .439 || .802 || 2.8 || 3.3 || .7 || .2 || 11.4
|-
| style="text-align:left;"|2017–18
| style="text-align:left;"|Wichita State
| 32 || 32 || 31.7 || .489 || .442 || .825 || 3.2 || 5.2 || .7 || .2 || 14.9
|- class="sortbottom"
| style="text-align:center;" colspan="2"|Career
| 71 || 68 || 28.6 || .480 || .437 || .811 || 3.0 || 4.1 || .8 || .2 || 12.9

References

External links

 Wichita State Shockers bio

1997 births
Living people
American men's basketball players
Basketball players from Kansas City, Missouri
Brooklyn Nets players
Los Angeles Clippers players
Philadelphia 76ers draft picks
Philadelphia 76ers players
Phoenix Suns players
Shooting guards
Wichita State Shockers men's basketball players